Gary S. Halvorson is an American director of television shows, series and film, best known for directing and producing the show, Friends.

Directing
He was trained as a classical pianist at but is primarily noted as the director of situation comedies such as Friends (of which he directed 56 episodes) and The Drew Carey Show. He also made his film directorial debut The Adventures of Elmo in Grouchland (1999), a children's film.

For the New York Metropolitan Opera, he directed high-definition theater simulcasts of The Magic Flute (30 Dec 2006), I Puritani (6 Jan 2007), Il Barbiere di Siviglia (24 Mar 2007), Il Tabarro (28 Apr 2007), Roméo et Juliette (15 Dec 2007), Macbeth (11 Jan 2008), Peter Grimes (15 Mar 2008), La Bohème (5 Apr 2008), La fille du régiment (26 Avr 2008), the 2008-09 opening night gala starring Renée Fleming (22 Sep 2008), Doctor Atomic (8 Nov 2008), Thaïs (20 Dec 2008), Lucia di Lammermoor (7 Feb 2009), Madama Butterfly (7 Mar 2009), La Cenerentola (9 May 2009), Tosca (10 Oct 2009), Aida (23 Oct 2008), Turandot (7 Nov 2009), Les Contes d'Hoffmann (19 Dec 2009), Carmen (16 Jan 2010), Armida (1 May 2010), Das Rheingold (9 Oct 2010), Don Pasquale (13 Nov 2010) and Don Carlo (11 Dec 2010).

Halvorson also directed Paul Simon's "You're The One" live concert in Paris, which aired on PBS and is available on DVD.

Filmography

Film

Television

Awards and nominations
He was awarded an Emmy for "Outstanding Special Class Directing" for the 78th Annual Macy's Thanksgiving Day Parade, shown on NBC. In 1996, he was awarded a Daytime Emmy Award for "Outstanding Directing in a Children's Series" for Adventures in Wonderland. He has also been nominated for "Outstanding Directing for a Comedy Series", for his work on Everybody Loves Raymond.

References

External links

American film directors
American television producers
American television directors
Daytime Emmy Award winners
Living people
Place of birth missing (living people)
Year of birth missing (living people)
Juilliard School alumni